The Tulu Ashta Mathas of Udupi are a group of eight mathas or Hindu monasteries established by Madhvacharya, the preceptor of the Dvaita school of Hindu thought with his direct disciples to be the first Swami, head of the matha.

The ashta mathas are named after the villages in which they were originally located. Today, the mathas are situated in the temple town of Udupi. The mathas work to propagate the Dvaita philosophy. They also administer the famous Udupi Krishna Temple by way of a formal rotation scheme called Paryaya.

When the ashta mathas were formed, Sri Madhvacharya initiated the Swamijis of the mathas in pairs. Each pair of mathas is called Dwandva  (literally, two or dual). In the event the current Paryaya Swamiji has difficulty performing his duties, the Swamiji from the Dwandwa matha takes over the responsibility. The four pairs of mathas are: Palimaru and Adamaru; Krishnapura and Puttige; Shirur and Sodhe; and Kaniyooru and Pejavara.

See also 
Paryaya
Uttaradi Math
Madhva Mathas

References 

Udupi Ashta Mathas and other Madhva Mathas
Around the Car Street
The Festival of Paryaya

External links 

Sri Puthige Matha
Sri Pejavara Adhokshaja Matha
Sri Adamaru Matha 
Sri Palimaru Matha
Sri Kaniyooru Matha

 
Dvaita Vedanta